Cyrtodactylus phongnhakebangensis (Vietnamese: Thằn lằn Phong Nha-Kẻ Bàng) is a species of gecko native to Phong Nha-Kẻ Bàng National Park, Quảng Bình Province, North Central Coast, Vietnam. It was discovered and described in 2002.

References

 

 ZIEGLER, T., RÖSLER, H., HERRMANN, H.-W. & VU NGOC THANH(2002): Cyrtodactylus phongnhakebangensis sp.n., ein neuer Bogenfingergecko aus dem annamitischen Karstwaldmassiv, Vietnam. - Herpetofauna, Weinstadt 24(141): 11–25.
 Atlas de la terrariophile Vol.3 : les lézards. Animalia Éditions, 2003. 

Cyrtodactylus
Endemic fauna of Vietnam
Reptiles of Vietnam
Reptiles described in 2003